Michael Rudolph Knuble (born July 4, 1972) is a Canadian-born American former professional ice hockey right winger who played in the National Hockey League (NHL). During his 16 NHL seasons, he played for the Detroit Red Wings, New York Rangers, Boston Bruins, Philadelphia Flyers and Washington Capitals.

He was a member of Detroit's 1997–98 Stanley Cup championship team, and was a part of the organization during their 1996–97 Stanley Cup.

Playing career

Collegiate
Knuble was drafted in the fourth round, 76th overall, by the Detroit Red Wings in the 1991 NHL Entry Draft. He played the next four years at the University of Michigan and was given Second Team CCHA All-Star honors in 1994 and 1995 and NCAA West All-American Team honors in 1995. Following his collegiate career, he made his professional debut in the 1995 Calder Cup playoffs with the Adirondack Red Wings of the American Hockey League (AHL).

Professional
Knuble spent the entire 1995–96 season and most of the 1996–97 season with the Adirondack Red Wings in the AHL before making his NHL debut with the Detroit Red Wings on March 26, 1997. His debut came against the Colorado Avalanche in the famous "Fight Night at the Joe" match. He played a total of nine regular season games in 1996–97 and none in the 1997 Stanley Cup playoffs. Detroit won the Stanley Cup that season, but Knuble's name was not engraved on the Cup since he had not played enough games. However, Detroit repeated as Cup Champions in 1997–98, his first full season in the NHL, and though he only played three playoff games, he met the necessary requirements to have his name engraved on the Cup. Knuble was included on both Stanley Cup winning team pictures in 1997 and 1998

Prior to the 1998–99 season, Detroit traded Knuble to the New York Rangers for a 2000 second-round draft choice (Tomáš Kopecký). Knuble played in all 82 games with the Rangers that season, recording 15 goals and 20 assists. With a month to go in the 1999–2000 season, the Rangers traded him to the Boston Bruins in exchange for Rob DiMaio. After posting 20 points in 82 games in 2000–01 and 14 points in 54 games in 2001–02, Knuble found himself playing left wing on a line with Joe Thornton and Glen Murray beginning in 2002–03. He scored 30 goals and 29 assists in 75 games, good for third on the Bruins.

Knuble enjoyed another solid season in 2003–04, 21 goals and 25 assists in 82 games with the Bruins. During which, he set the NHL record for the fastest two goals to start a game by one player on February 14 against the Florida Panthers. He scored a goal ten seconds into the first period and followed it up with another just 27 seconds into the game. After the season, Knuble signed a three-year contract with the Philadelphia Flyers in the off-season. He then played for Linköpings HC of the Swedish Elitserien during the 2004–05 NHL lockout, scoring 26 goals and assisting on 13 others in 49 games.

When the lockout came to an end, Knuble was slotted to play right wing on a line with Simon Gagné and Peter Forsberg, a line which was later nicknamed the "Deuces Wild Line." He responded with his best season as a professional in 2005–06, recording career highs in goals (34), assists (31) and points (65). On pace to duplicate his numbers despite his team's poor season in 2006–07, Knuble's season was nearly cut short after a collision with Rangers forward and former Red Wings teammate Brendan Shanahan. After missing a month of action, he returned to the ice and finished with 24 goals and 30 assists in 64 games and brought his plus-minus rating to +2, Knuble being one of two Flyers (Gagné being the other) to finish with a plus rating for the season.

Knuble recorded his first career hat trick on February 2, 2008, scoring all the goals in a 3–0 Flyers win over the Anaheim Ducks. He netted his first career playoff overtime goal on April 17, 2008, scoring the winner during the second overtime of the Flyers' 4–3 victory over the Washington Capitals. He has traveled to schools in New Jersey and Philadelphia teaching kids about hockey in his free time.

On July 1, 2009, Knuble signed a two-year deal worth $2.8 million a season with the Washington Capitals.

On November 13, 2009, in a game against the Minnesota Wild, Knuble broke a finger in the first period and did not finish the game. He returned on December 11 after missing four weeks of action. Knuble scored Washington's first goal in the second period of the 2011 NHL Winter Classic against Pittsburgh Penguins' goaltender Marc-André Fleury.

On April 11, 2011, Knuble was re-signed to a one-year, $2 million contract extension with the Capitals. During the 2011–12 season, on December 20, 2011, Knuble played in his 1,000th NHL game. At that time, Knuble had scored 221 NHL goals since turning age 30.

On January 24, 2013, Knuble signed a one-year deal to return to the Philadelphia Flyers.

Coaching

Knuble is currently an assistant coach with the Grand Rapids Griffins, Detroit's minor league affiliate.

Personal life
Born in Toronto, Ontario, Knuble was raised with younger brother Steve in Kentwood, Michigan, by his Latvian-born parents, Aivars and Māra (Miesnieks) Knuble. Because he was born in Canada, Mike has dual Canadian/American citizenship. His father Aivars died of a heart attack at the age of 45 in 1987 when Mike was 15 years old.

Knuble is married to wife Megan. Together they have three children. Cam Knuble was playing hockey in the USHL with the Muskegon Lumberjacks in January 2018.

Mike's brother Steve, who attended Michigan State University, lives in Huntsville, Alabama, but has run a hockey clinic in Ann Arbor, Michigan, since 1996.

The Knuble family are currently living in Grand Rapids, Michigan, where he was raised as a child.

Awards and honors

1997–98: Stanley Cup Detroit Red Wings (NHL)
2006–07: Yanick Dupre Memorial

Career statistics

Regular season and playoffs

International

See also
List of NHL players with 1000 games played

References

External links

 

1972 births
Adirondack Red Wings players
American men's ice hockey right wingers
Canadian emigrants to the United States
American people of Latvian descent
Boston Bruins players
Canadian ice hockey right wingers
Detroit Red Wings draft picks
Detroit Red Wings players
Grand Rapids Griffins players
Ice hockey players from Michigan
Ice hockey players at the 2006 Winter Olympics
Linköping HC players
Living people
Michigan Wolverines men's ice hockey players
New York Rangers players
Olympic ice hockey players of the United States
Sportspeople from Grand Rapids, Michigan
Philadelphia Flyers players
Stanley Cup champions
Washington Capitals players
People from Kentwood, Michigan
Canadian expatriate ice hockey players in Sweden
AHCA Division I men's ice hockey All-Americans